SS City of Adelaide may refer to one of three steamships named after the Australian city of Adelaide:

 , launched in 1863. She was converted to a barque in 1890, hulked in 1902 and ran aground in 1916.
 , launched in 1916 and operated by Ellerman Lines. She was sunk by a submarine in 1918.
 , launched in 1920 and operated by Ellerman Lines. She was sunk by a submarine in 1944.

See also
 , a clipper ship launched in 1864. She was renamed Carrick in 1923, and City of Adelaide in 2001.
 , a cargo vessel launched in 1963, renamed Cap Cleveland in 1972, City of Canterbury in 1973, Rubens in 1975 and A. L. Pioneer in 1983. She was scrapped in 1983.
 City of Adelaide (disambiguation)

Ship names